Nesorhinus is an extinct genus of rhinoceros from the Pleistocene of Asia. It contains two species, Nesorhinus philippinensis (formerly Rhinoceros philippinensis) from Luzon, Philippines and Nesorhinus hayasakai (formerly Rhinoceros sinensis hayasakai) from Taiwan.

Discovery 

N. philippinensis was first described by Gustav Heinrich Ralph von Koenigswald in 1956 as Rhinoceros philippinensis based on fossil teeth that were excavated in Cagayan province of the Philippines in 1936. These bones were lost and he did not provide for a holotype.A fossilized jaw of N. philippinensis was unearthed by Mr. de Asis on May 13, 1965 in the Fort Bonifacio area. The specimen was unearthed from an ash deposit produced by the volcano called the Guadalupe Formation. A 75-percent complete fossil of the N. philippinensis was unearthed in Rizal, Kalinga along with 57 stone tools in 2014. A 2018 study placed the date of the rhino fossil at around 709,000 years old (dating to the early Middle Pleistocene) after the rhino's tooth enamel was subjected to electron spin resonance dating. The authors of the study found butchery marks on the bones of the ribs, metacarpals and both humeri suggesting that the rhino had been butchered by early humans or hominins. While no bones from any hominin were reported from the site, over 50 stone tools found in context with the rhinoceros provided direct evidence for human activities at the site.

Nesorhinus hayasaki was originally named as R. sinensis hayasakai by Otsuka & Lin in 1984. It is known remains found in Taiwan dating to the Early and Middle Pleistocene.

Description 
Both species are relatively small, and comparable in size to living Sumatran and Javan rhinoceros, with shoulder heights of 123-131 cm, with Nesorhinus hayasaki being somewhat larger than N. philippinensis with an estimated body mass of approximately 1018-1670 kilograms, in comparison to 998-1185 kilograms estimated for N. philippinensis.

Evolution 
Its describers suggested it island-hopped from the Asian mainland to Taiwan and Luzon sometime during the Late Miocene or later, probably from the Asian mainland to Taiwan and then from Taiwan to Luzon. It has been suggested to have a close relationship with the genus Rhinoceros.

References 

Rhinoceroses
Prehistoric placental genera
Fossil taxa described in 2021
Fauna of the Philippines